Cane Grove is an agricultural community in the Demerara-Mahaica Region of Guyana, standing at sea level on the coastal plain, along the Mahaica River, about eight kilometres upstream of its mouth. 
John Carter, Guyana's first ambassador to the United States and a key figure in the pre-independence turmoil of what was, before 1966, British Guiana was born in Cane Grove.

The diaspora of Cane Grove hold an annual reunion in New York City where proceeds go toward funding various charity projects that help the current residents of the village.

References

Populated places in Demerara-Mahaica